Paul Chase (born April 8, 1981 in Attleboro, Massachusetts, United States) was a U.S. soccer defender who last played for American USL Second Division side Wilmington Hammerheads.

Chase attended Boston College where he played on the men's soccer team from 2001 to 2004.  During the collegiate off-season, he would also play for the Cape Cod Crusaders of the fourth division Premier Development League.  In 2004, he signed with the Wilmington Hammerheads, continuing with the team through the 2006 season.

He supports the Boston Red Sox baseball team and his favourite American football team is the New England Patriots. His favourite foods are steak and seafood.

Honors

Cape Cod Crusaders
USL Premier Development League Champions (1): 2003

1981 births
Living people
American soccer players
Cape Cod Crusaders players
Wilmington Hammerheads FC players
USL Second Division players
Boston College Eagles men's soccer players
USL League Two players
Soccer players from Massachusetts
Association football defenders